"Workin" is a song written by and performed by American rapper Sean "Puff Daddy" Combs. It was released on October 15, 2015 as the first single of Combs' mixtape MMM (Money Making Mitch). The album version of the track contains guest verses from Big Sean and Travis Scott.

Music video 
The music video directed by Hype Williams. The video was released on November 23, 2015 at Vevo and YouTube.

Track listing 
Digital download
"Workin"  — 3:04

Remixes 
On November 23, 2015, Combs' released a remix of the song also featuring Travis Scott and Big Sean at Vevo and YouTube account.

References

2015 songs
2015 singles
Sean Combs songs
Big Sean songs
Bad Boy Records singles
Songs written by Sean Combs
Songs written by Cyhi the Prynce